Amtali is an upazila of Barguna District in the division of Barisal, Bangladesh.Its a coastal area.

Geography
It has 45,804 households and a total area of 695 square km with 212 square km of water bodies.

Demographics

According to the 2011 Bangladesh census, Amtali Upazila had 63,212 households and a population of 270,802, 8.1% of whom lived in urban areas. 10.3% of the population was under the age of 5. The literacy rate (age 7 and over) was 89.8%, compared to the national average of 72.8%.

Administration
Amtali Upazila is divided into Amtali Municipality and seven union parishads: Amtali, Arpangasia, Atharogasia,Chawra, Gulishakhali, Holodia, and Kukua.

Amtali Municipality is subdivided into 9 wards and 14 mahallas.

See also
 Upazilas of Bangladesh
 Districts of Bangladesh
 Divisions of Bangladesh

References

External links
 amtali.com 

Populated places in Barguna District
Upazilas of Barguna District